Okstindbreen is the eighth-largest glacier in mainland Norway.  The  glacier lies in the Okstindan mountain range in the municipality of Hemnes in Nordland county.

At the eastern edge of the glacier lies the mountain Oksskolten, the highest point in Nordland county.

See also
List of glaciers in Norway

References

Glaciers of Nordland
Hemnes